Camden is an Italian Villa-style house on the Rappahannock River just downriver of Port Royal, Virginia. Built 1857–1859, it is one of the nation's finest examples of an Italianate country house. Camden was declared a National Historic Landmark in 1971 for its architecture.

Description and history
Camden is a two-story frame house in a pure Italianate style, clad with flush siding that was originally treated to resemble stone. The tower base projects from the front, with a semicircular porch surrounding its base, looking out over the Rappahannock River. The first floor includes a central hall, library, dining room, parlor and a main-level bedroom.  The parlor retains its original Victorian rococo furnishings.

Camden was built on the basement of an earlier house belonging to the Pratt family that dated to 1760. William Carter Pratt demolished this house around 1856 to use the prominent site for a new house. He engaged Baltimore architect Norris G. Starkweather, with construction stating in 1857, completed in 1859. Up-to-date in style and technology, the house was equipped with central heating and cooling, gas lights and running water.  A private gas works was installed to generate gas for the lights. The house's tower was destroyed during the American Civil War, by a hit from a Union gunboat in late November 1862, and never restored.

The property is also significant as the home of a Native American family of the late 17th century, where iron trade tools and silver medals have been found. The silver medals were minted by the British and given to the Powhatan chiefs as tokens of peace. 
The Silver medals were discovered on the property during the excavation of an older structure, eventually discovered to be the house of John "The Ranger" Taliaferro.

See also

List of National Historic Landmarks in Virginia
National Register of Historic Places listings in Caroline County, Virginia

References

External links
Camden: 1 photo, at Virginia DHR

National Historic Landmarks in Virginia
Houses in Caroline County, Virginia
Houses on the National Register of Historic Places in Virginia
Houses completed in 1859
Italianate architecture in Virginia
National Register of Historic Places in Caroline County, Virginia
Historic American Buildings Survey in Virginia
1859 establishments in Virginia